The European Le Mans Series (known from 2004 to 2005 as the Le Mans Endurance Series and from 2006 to 2011 as the Le Mans Series) has raced on 17 different circuits in its 19-year history. The series has visited the United Kingdom in each year of its existence except in 2020 & 2021 due to the COVID-19 pandemic.  The series made forays outside of Europe in 2005 and 2006 to Istanbul Park in Turkey. In the year 2007 to Interlagos in Brazil South America, and in 2012 to Road Atlanta in the United States.

Circuits

By country

External links
European Le Mans Series Circuits
Racing Sports Cars LMS archive

Circuits
European Le Mans